Tmemophlebia coquilletti is a species of bee fly in the family Bombyliidae.

References

Bombyliidae
Articles created by Qbugbot
Insects described in 1902